My Sweetheart is a 1918 British silent comedy film directed by Meyrick Milton and starring Concordia Merrel, Randle Ayrton and Bert Wynne. It was based on a play by Minnie Palmer.

Cast
 Concordia Merrel - Mrs. Fleeter
 Randle Ayrton - Joe Shotwell
 Bert Wynne - Tony
 E.H. Kelly - Dudley Harcourt
 Marguerite Blanche - Tina Hatzell

References

External links
 

1918 films
British comedy films
British silent feature films
Films directed by Meyrick Milton
1918 comedy films
British films based on plays
Ideal Film Company films
British black-and-white films
1910s English-language films
1910s British films
Silent comedy films